Dale Scott Dorning (born February 7, 1962) is a former American football defensive end who played for the Seattle Seahawks of the National Football League (NFL). He played college football at University of Oregon.

References 

Living people
1962 births
People from Burien, Washington
Sportspeople from King County, Washington
American football defensive ends
Oregon Ducks football players
Seattle Seahawks players